Renée Héribel (9 February 1903 – 25 July 1952) was a French film actress.

Selected filmography
 Fanfan la Tulipe (1925)
 The White Slave (1927)
 The City of a Thousand Delights (1927)
 Prince Jean (1928)
 The Joker (1928)
 The King of Carnival (1928)
 Cagliostro (1929)
 The Three Masks (1929)
 The Night of Terror (1929)
 The Love Market (1930)
 Everybody Wins (1930)
 The Triangle of Fire (1932)

References

Bibliography
 Goble, Alan. The Complete Index to Literary Sources in Film. Walter de Gruyter, 1999.

External links

1903 births
1952 deaths
French film actresses
French silent film actresses
20th-century French actresses
Actors from Caen